Where Are You Now may refer to:

 Where Are You Now? (novel), by Mary Higgins Clark, 2008
Where Are You Now (Cerrone X), a 1983 album by Cerrone

Songs
"Where Are You Now" (2 Unlimited song), 1993
"Where Are You Now" (Clint Black song), 1991
"Where Are You Now" (Jimmy Harnen song), 1989
"Where Are You Now" (Lost Frequencies song), 2021, featuring Calum Scott
"Where Are You Now?" (Roxus song), 1991
"Where Are You Now" (Trisha Yearwood song), 2000
"Where Are You Now (My Love)", by Jackie Trent, 1965
"Where Are Ü Now", by Jack Ü and Justin Bieber, 2015
"Where Are You Now?", by Brandy from the Batman Forever film soundtrack, 1995
"Where Are You Now", by Britney Spears from Oops!... I Did It Again, 2000
"Where Are You Now", by Donna De Lory from Sky Is Open, 2006
"Where Are You Now", by Honor Society from Fashionably Late, 2009
"Where Are You Now?", by ItaloBrothers, 2008
"Where Are You Now", by J. Holiday from Guilty Conscience, 2014
"Where Are You Now", by Janet Jackson from Janet, 1993
"Where Are You Now?", by Justin Bieber from My World 2.0, 2010
"Where Are You Now?", by Michelle Branch from Hotel Paper, 2003
"Where Are You Now", by Mumford & Sons from Babel, 2012
"Where Are You Now", by Nazareth from their album Sound Elixir, 1983
"Where Are You Now?", by Royal Blood from How Did We Get So Dark?, 2016
"Where Are You Now", by Union J from Union J, 2013

See also
 WAYN (website) (an acronym for "Where Are You Now?"), a social networking website
Where Are You (disambiguation)